Canal is a station on Line 2 and Line 7 of the Madrid Metro. It is located in fare Zone A.

The name of the station refers to Madrid's water company, the Canal de Isabel II which has offices and water supply infrastructure nearby.

History
The Canal station opened on 16 October, 1998 as part of both Line 2 and Line 7.

References 

Line 2 (Madrid Metro) stations
Line 7 (Madrid Metro) stations
Railway stations in Spain opened in 1998
Buildings and structures in Chamberí District, Madrid